The Gantang–Wuwei railway is a railway line in China. The western terminus of the line is Gantang railway station on the Baotou–Lanzhou railway and the eastern terminus of the line is Wuwei South railway station on the Lanzhou–Xinjiang railway.

History
The line was opened on 1 January 1966. Work to add a second track began in July 2014.

References

Railway lines in China
Railway lines opened in 1966